David "Doc" Searls (born July 29, 1947), is an American journalist, columnist, and a widely read blogger. He is the host of FLOSS Weekly, a free and open-source software (FLOSS) themed netcast from the TWiT Network, a co-author of The Cluetrain Manifesto, author of The Intention Economy: When Customers Take Charge, Editor-in-Chief of Linux Journal, a fellow at the Center for Information Technology & Society (CITS) at the University of California, Santa Barbara, an alumnus fellow (2006–2010) of the Berkman Center for Internet & Society at Harvard University, and co-host of the Reality 2.0 Podcast.

Overview
Searls' journalism career began in 1971, when he worked as an editor and photographer for Wayne Today in New Jersey.

A longtime advocate for open-source software, he has been involved with the Linux Journal since it began publishing in 1994. He became a Contributing Editor in 1996, Senior Editor in 1999, and Editor-in-Chief in 2018. His column "Linux for Suits" ran until 2007, and was followed by "EOF" inside each issue's back cover. His work with Linux Journal, and as an advocate of free software and open-source, earned him a Google-O'Reilly Open Source Award for Best Communicator in 2005. His byline has also appeared in many other publications, including OMNI, Wired, PC Magazine, The Standard, The Sun Magazine, Upside, Release 1.0 and The Globe and Mail.

In early 1999 Searls joined Christopher Locke, David Weinberger and Rick Levine in writing The Cluetrain Manifesto, an iconoclastic website that was followed in January 2000 by the book with the same title. The book was published in nine languages. A 10th Anniversary edition came out in June 2009. Among Searls' contributions to the Manifesto was its first thesis, "Markets are conversations"—also the title of the Cluetrain chapter he co-wrote with David Weinberger. Weinberger and Searls co-wrote "World of Ends: What the Internet Is and How to Stop Mistaking It for Something Else".

Searls has also been a blogger since October 1999, when he started blogging with help from his friend Dave Winer. In an Online Journalism Review article, J.D. Lasica calls Searls "one of the deep thinkers in the blog movement."

In The World Is Flat, Thomas L. Friedman calls Searls "one of the most respected technology writers in America."

Searls' two academic fellowships both began in 2006. At the Berkman Center for Internet & Society he leads ProjectVRM, which guides independent software development communities working on Vendor Relationship Management (VRM). The purpose of VRM is to equip individuals with tools that provide both independence from vendor "lock-in" and better means for engaging with vendors. VRM tools and methods also help individuals engage with government and other non-commercial organizations. At the Center for Information Technology and Society (CITS) at the University of California, Santa Barbara, Searls is studying both the nature of infrastructure and of the Internet as a form of infrastructure.

In April 2012, his book The Intention Economy: When Customers Take Charge was published. Searls coined the term in an article for Linux Journal. He wrote: "The Intention Economy grows around buyers, not sellers. It leverages the simple fact that buyers are the first source of money, and that they come ready-made. You don't need advertising to make them."

In September 2018, Searls spoke at TedX Santa Barbara, giving a talk titled  "The Story isn't the Whole Story:
Journalism in the digital age is challenged by a business model of automated advertising that creates widespread distrust. Truth is getting lost in the process. What can we do about that?"

Background

The nickname "Doc" is what Searls calls a "fossil remnant" of "Doctor Dave," his humorous persona at WDBS (now WXDU) radio at Duke University in Durham, North Carolina, in the late 1970s. Following his work in radio, Searls co-founded Hodskins Simone & Searls (HS&S). Searls' consultancy, The Searls Group, was spun out of HS&S in the early 1990s. He is a frequent speaker at business and industry events, under the auspices of The Searls Group.

Searls is a 1969 graduate of Guilford College. While Searls' permanent home is in Santa Barbara, he and his family currently live most of the year near his work at Harvard.

References

External links

 
 Doc Searls's current blog
 Reality 2.0 Podcast
 Archive of Searls' original blog from November 1999 to August 2007 (original at doc.weblogs.com offline as of 2012–218 or perhaps earlier)
 Linux Link Tech Show interview (audio), 2005
 ProjectVRM
 2005 Google-O'Reilly Open Source Award Winner for "Best Communicator"
 Searls on the Intention Economy, EconTalk, Library of Economics and Liberty, 2013

1947 births
Living people
American bloggers
American technology writers
Berkman Fellows
Guilford College alumni
Writers from Jersey City, New Jersey
Aerial photographers
American podcasters
Creative Commons-licensed authors
21st-century American non-fiction writers